Kyrylo Oleksandrovych Prokopchuk (born 14 February 1998) is a Ukrainian professional footballer who plays as a centre-back for Ukrainian club Kramatorsk.

References

External links
 

1998 births
Living people
Footballers from Dnipro
Ukrainian footballers
Association football defenders
FC Oleksandriya players
FC Polissya Zhytomyr players
FC Kramatorsk players
Ukrainian Premier League players
Ukrainian First League players